Jurinea akinfievii, the Akinfiev's jurinea, is a herbaceous plant, a member of the Asteraceae family.

Distribution 
It is an native species to the Caucusus.

Taxonomy 
It was named by E.S. Nemirova, in Cass. In: Bull. Soc. Philom. 140. in 1821.

References

External links 

Cynareae